George Toporcer (born Toporczer; February 9, 1899 – May 17, 1989) was a professional baseball player and executive. He served primarily as a utility infielder during his eight seasons in Major League Baseball, playing for the St. Louis Cardinals from 1921 through 1928. Toporcer is widely considered as the first major league baseball position player to wear eyeglasses on the playing field. The distinction gained Toporcer his nickname, "Specs".

Early life 
From an early age, like most children at the time, George Toporczer was obsessed with baseball. In an interview, he admitted that for the last seventy five years scarce a day had gone by that he had not contemplated the sport. He stated that in spite of his obsession he was always picked last during childhood games because of his slight build and glasses. He went to school and became friends with actor Jimmy Cagney, staying in touch into the later portions of their lives. Toporczer said the first thing that hooked him on baseball was when he was six and went to the 1905 World Series. At the World Series he watched the Giants’ Christy Mathewson pitch three shutouts  The experience was further reinforced by his two older brothers who, being diehard Giants fans, idolized the players, speaking of little else but the performance of their favorite team. The fanaticism of his older brothers soaked into young George and he too became a diehard Giants fan. By the time he was ten he would walk the five miles from his house to the Polo Grounds. Although the one cent allowance that his father, a shoe and boot seller, was not enough to get him a ticket, he found a spot on Coogan's Bluff that he could take advantage of an open space in the roof of the Polo Grounds.

Unlike most of his peers, he was enthralled with what was known then as inside baseball which were the strategies and tactics of the "dead-ball" era.  While still loving the Giant's players, Toporczer held a special admiration of the Giants’ manager John McGraw, who he considered the best of his time.  Out of all of the Giants players, George's favorite was the left fielder, George Burns.  When he was thirteen Toporczer got a job at a local saloon as a scorekeeper, writing down the scores of the baseball games in exchange for fifty cents and free meals.  While in seventh grade George's history teacher formed a school baseball team but he was turned down from it because of his slight figure and his glasses.  Even though he was not on the team, Toporczer still went to all of their games to cheer them on.  At one of these games, he was the only one there to cheer the team on and the team was short one player so he was drafted into play centerfield.  During that game he made a difficult catch and contributed two hits.  Around this time Toporczer's father died and passed the business on to George's older brother.  George had to forgo high school and help his brother run the shoe and boot store.  By working at the store and picking up odd jobs on the side, \ Toporczer was making more than enough to buy tickets and would regularly go to the Polo Grounds.

Playing career

Major leagues 
Born and reared in the Yorkville section of Manhattan, he never played high school or college ball and went directly from the sandlots to major league competition in 1921. Now known as George Toporcer, he split his first professional season between the Cardinals and the minor league Syracuse Stars, the Cardinals' top farm team. In 1928, Toporcer got into only eight games for the Cardinals, and spent the bulk of the year with their top farm team, the Rochester Red Wings.

In his eight-season major-league career, Toporcer was a .279 hitter with nine home runs and 151 RBI in 546 games. As a fielder, he appeared in 453 games, playing shortstop (249 games), second base (105), third base (95), first base (3) and right field (1).

Minor league player-manager 
Following his major league career, Toporcer played for the Cardinals Triple-A affiliate Rochester on four straight pennant-winning teams (1929–1932), being named the International League MVP in 1929 and 1930. He became the Red Wings' manager in 1932, continuing to play and manage the team until 1934. He continued to play in the minors until 1941, typically serving as a player-manager.  During his seven years playing for Rochester, the Red Wings won the International League pennant four consecutive years.  For the last three years in Rochester, he served as the manager of the Rochester team.  But after a financial dispute with general manager Branch Rickey, Toporcer left the St. Louis organization. He would pilot other minor league teams for the next seven years before he became the farm director for the Boston Red Sox.

Toporcer left the Red Sox in 1948 and became the farm system director of the Chicago White Sox in 1949 and 1950.

Loss of sight
In 1951, while managing the Buffalo Bisons, Toporcer became blind after a fifth operation to save his failing eyesight was unsuccessful.

During his time as the farm director for the Red Sox, Toporcer had begun to notice spots in his vision that were obstructing his sight.  After visiting an eye specialist and having a lengthy examination, the doctor diagnosed him with a detached retina.  Toporcer got the required surgery and the doctor proscribed a thirty-day bed rest, forbidden from moving his head so as not the dislodge the retina while it healed.  Once the thirty days were over, the doctor removed the bandages to find the surgery had been unsuccessful; Toporcer had lost sight in his left eye.  Another attempt was made to save his left eye, but it was unsuccessful.  Then, while managing Buffalo in 1951, Toporcer began to experience problems with his right eye.  After three more unsuccessful surgeries on that orb, Toporcer became blind in both eyes.

The Cardinals and Red Sox held benefits to defray the expenses of Toporcer's eye surgeries, but because years of playing baseball had toughened his fingertips, he was not able to master Braille. He became a motivational speaker and was known as "Baseball's Blind Ambassador."

In 1944, Toporcer wrote an autobiography, Baseball – From Backlots to Big Leagues, still considered one of the best manuals of instruction for coaches and young players. His life story was featured in a network TV show in which he played the lead.

Toporcer died in Huntington Station, New York, at the age of 90 from injuries sustained in a fall at his home. He was the last surviving member of the 1926 World Champion St. Louis Cardinals.

Quotation
Branch Rickey once told this story about Specs Toporcer: "A 19-year-old boy who weighed 142 pounds and never had played a game of pro ball came off the field at Orange, New Jersey. I watched this kid and saw him take off his glasses and, with his hands outstretched, grope his way along the wall to the showers. My captain turned to me and said, For God's sake, who sent him up?" - Norman L. Macht, baseball writer and statistician

See also
The Glory of Their Times, 1966 book

References

External links 

Skelton, David E., Specs Toporcer. Society for American Baseball Research Biography Project 

1899 births
1989 deaths
Accidental deaths from falls
Accidental deaths in New York (state)
Albany Senators players
Boston Red Sox executives
Buffalo Bisons (minor league) managers
Chicago White Sox executives
Hazleton Red Sox players
Jersey City Skeeters players
Major League Baseball farm directors
Major League Baseball infielders
People from Long Island
St. Louis Cardinals players
Syracuse Stars (minor league baseball) players
Rochester Red Wings managers
Rochester Red Wings players
Rocky Mount Red Sox players
Baseball players from New York City
Syracuse Chiefs players